Carolyn Brown may refer to:
Carolyn Brown (choreographer) (born 1927), American dancer, choreographer, and writer
Carolyn Brown (newsreader), BBC Radio 4 newsreader and continuity announcer
Carolyn Brown (author) (born 1948), American novelist
Carolyn Tener Brown (born 1960), American ballet coach
Carolyn J. Brown (born 1961), Canadian geneticist
Carolyn J. Brown, audiologist / otologist (University of Iowa)

See also
Caroline Brown (disambiguation)
Carrie Brown (disambiguation)